The 2019 World Judo Cadets Championships is an edition of the World Judo Cadets Championships, organised by the International Judo Federation. It was held in Almaty, Kazakhstan from 25 to 29 September 2019. The final day of competition featured a mixed team event, won by team Japan.

Medal summary

Medal table

Men's events

Women's events

Source Results

Mixed

Source Results

Prize money
The sums written are per medalist, bringing the total prizes awarded to 80,000$ for the individual contests and 20,000$ for the team competition.

References

External links
 

World Judo Cadets Championships
 U18
World Championships, U18
Judo
World 2019
Judo
Judo, World Championships U18